The Fokker D.IV was a German fighter biplane of World War I, a development of the D.I.

Development
The Fokker D.IV had a more powerful Mercedes D.III engine, and the first Fokker front-line design to use ailerons in place of wing warping from the start for roll control.

Operational history
The aircraft was purchased in small numbers (40) by the German Army and saw service on the Western Front. The Swedish Air Force also bought four examples of the type.

Operators
 
 Luftstreitkrafte - 40 aircraft.
 
 Swedish Air Force - Four aircraft.

Specifications

References

Notes

Bibliography

 Green, William and Gordon Swanborough. The Complete Book of Fighters. London: Greenwich Editions, 1994. .
 Lamberton, W. M. Fighter Aircraft of the 1914-1918 War. Letchworth, Herts, UK: Harleyford Publications Limited, 1960.
 Taylor, Michael J. H. Jane's Encyclopedia of Aviation. London: Studio Editions, 1989. . 
 Wagner, Ray and Heinz Nowarra. German Combat Planes: A Comprehensive Survey and History of the Development of German Military Aircraft from 1914 to 1945. New York: Doubleday, 1971.
 World Aircraft Information Files: File 894 Sheet 40–41. London: Bright Star Publishing, 1989.

1910s German fighter aircraft
D 04
Biplanes
Aircraft first flown in 1916